EHOVE Career Center is a public vocational school in Milan, Ohio. EHOVE is an acronym that stands for Erie Huron Ottawa Vocational Education. While Erie, Huron and Ottawa counties are the primary covered counties in the district, the school also serves students in nearby Lorain, Sandusky, and Seneca counties, as well as small parts of Ashland and Richland counties.

Altogether the high school has an enrollment of 900 high school sophomore, junior and senior students from about 16 different associate school districts. Upon graduation, students earn a certificate from EHOVE, along with a high school diploma from their home high school.

Partner schools 
source

Bellevue High School
Danbury High School
Edison High School
Huron High School
Kelleys Island School
Margaretta High School
Monroeville High School
New London High School
Norwalk High School
Perkins High School
Put-In-Bay High School
St. Mary Central Catholic High School
St. Paul High School
South Central High School
Vermilion High School
Western Reserve High School

History 
In the 1960s with the completion of the Ohio Turnpike and other local growths in the economy and infrastructure, Ohio government officials began to consider the creation of a vocational school that could provide worker training through the public school system. In 1965 the Erie Huron Ottawa Vocational Board (EHOVE) was formed to plan the school in the Erie and Huron County area. Much of the building funds were matched with public funding measures passed with the help of Ohio's 61st and 63rd Governor James A. Rhodes.

The school opened its doors in the fall of 1968.

References

Vocational schools in Ohio